Lemyra minuta is a moth of the family Erebidae. It was described by Karel Černý in 2009. It is found in Thailand.

References

 

minuta
Moths described in 2009